A total lunar eclipse took place on Sunday, July 26, 1953.

The Moon passed through the very center of the Earth's shadow. While the visual effect of a total eclipse is variable, the Moon may have been stained a deep orange or red colour at maximum eclipse. This was a great spectacle for everyone who saw it from Australia as well as parts of Asia, Korea, New Zealand and Hawaii. The partial eclipse lasted for 3 hours and 35 minutes 42 seconds in total.
With an umbral eclipse magnitude of 1.8628, this was the largest lunar eclipse of the 20th century. Gamma had a value of only -0.0071. Due to the Moon's relatively large size, totality lasted 100 minutes 42 seconds unlike July 16, 2000 which lasted 106 minutes 25 seconds, the longest since August 13, 1859 (which was only 3 seconds longer). This was the darkest total lunar eclipse in the 20th century.

Visibility
It can all be seen from Australia, is seen rising in East Asia and is seen in North and South America. It is also visible from Korea as well as New Zealand and Hawaii, including Vietnam

Related lunar eclipses

Lunar year series

Saros series 

Lunar Saros 128 contains 15 total lunar eclipses between 1845 and 2097 (in years 1845, 1863, 1881, 1899, 1917, 1935, 1953, 1971, 1989, 2007, 2025, 2043, 2061, 2079 and 2097). Solar Saros 135 interleaves with this lunar saros with an event occurring every 9 years 5 days alternating between each saros series.

Inex series

Half-Saros cycle
A lunar eclipse will be preceded and followed by solar eclipses by 9 years and 5.5 days (a half saros). This lunar eclipse is related to two annular solar eclipses of Solar Saros 135.

See also
List of lunar eclipses
List of 20th-century lunar eclipses

Notes

External links
NASA: Lunar Eclipses: Past and Future

Index to Five Millennium Catalog of Lunar Eclipses, -1999 to +3000 (2000 BCE to 3000 CE)
Eclipses: 1901 to 2000
Photoelectric Photometry of the Lunar Eclipse of July 26, 1953, Publications of the Astronomical Society of the Pacific, Vol. 69, No. 407, p.153

References
Bao-Lin Liu, Canon of Lunar Eclipses 1500 B.C.-A.D. 3000, 1992

1953-07
1953-07
1953 in science
July 1953 events